Chlorospingus is a genus of perching birds, the bush tanagers, traditionally placed in the tanager family (Thraupidae). More recent studies which suggest they are closely related to the genus Arremonops in the Passerellidae (American sparrows).  As of July, 2017, the American Ornithological Society assigns the genus to the new family Passerellidae, which contains the New World sparrows.

It contains these species:
 Ashy-throated bush tanager, C. canigularis
 Yellow-throated bush tanager, C. flavigularis
 Common bush tanager, C. flavopectus
 Dusky-headed bush tanager, C. (flavopectus) postocularis
 White-fronted bush tanager, C. (flavopectus) albifrons
 Dwight's bush tanager, C. (flavopectus) dwighti
 Wetmore's bush tanager, C. (flavopectus) wetmorei
 Pirre bush tanager, C. inornatus
 Yellow-whiskered bush tanager, C. parvirostris
 Sooty-capped bush tanager, C. pileatus
 Dusky bush tanager, C. semifuscus
 Tacarcuna bush tanager, C. tacarcunae

The taxonomy and systematics of the common bush tanager are under review; it appears to be a superspecies or even a complex of superspecies.

References

 
Bird genera
Taxa named by Jean Cabanis
Taxonomy articles created by Polbot